is a 1980 Japanese film directed by Kazuki Ōmori.

Cast
Masato Furuoya
Ran Ito
Akira Emoto
Yoshio Harada
Kai Atō
Osamu Tezuka (special appearance) 
Seijun Suzuki (special appearance)

Awards
2nd Yokohama Film Festival
 Best Actor - Masato Furuoya
 Best Supporting Actress - Ran Ito
 6th Best Film
5th Hochi Film Award
 Best Actor - Masato Furuoya

References

External links
 

1980 films
Films directed by Kazuki Ōmori
1980s Japanese films